is a garment worn in Japan by people attending religious ceremonies and activities, including Buddhist and Shinto related occasions. The  is essentially a white , traditional hunting robes worn by nobles during the Heian period.

The garment is usually white or yellow, and is made of linen or silk depending on its type and use.

See also
 Glossary of Shinto

External links 
Basic terms of Shinto (with illustration)
Courtier in Shinto ceremonial robe (with illustration)

Shinto religious clothing
Japanese upper-body garments
Shinto religious objects
Japanese words and phrases